The following is a list of notable honor killings in Iran:

References 

Deaths by person in Iran
Familicides
Victims of familial execution
Honor killing victims
Honor killing in Asia
Iran crime-related lists
Lists of murders
Lists of victims of crimes